Plainview may refer to:
Plainview, Yell County, Arkansas, an incorporated city
Plainview, Arkansas County, Arkansas
Plainview, Logan County, Arkansas
Plainview, White County, Arkansas